Brent Estabrook is an American artist best known for oil paintings of stuffed animals.

Early life and career 
Brent completed BFA from the University of Arizona and has a Doctorate of Dental Surgery (DMD) from the University of Louisville. Estabrook uses a precise painting style and is most recognised for his large-scale oil paintings of stuffed animals. Influenced by his doctorate Estabook uses a unique technique for mixing and applying paint. He builds up a rich impasto that mimics the fibres of velvety fabric, velvet, and fleece with each thick, deeply coloured brushstroke and then he combines the unrestrained delight and curiosity typical of children's play with his painting approach.

References

Living people
Year of birth missing (living people)